Samseong mythology is a mythology originated in the Tamna, present-day Jeju island, which is different from Dangun mythology in Korean peninsula. There are following descriptions in Yeong Ju Ji, Goryeosa, Nasanok (）and Tamnaraji. Also in Goryeosa, Nasanok, and Tamnaraji, Byeoknangguk was explained as Japan and a girl who come from that country.

Outline 
There are the following description in Goryeosa, volume 57.

See also 
 Samseonghyeol
 Tamna
 Korean mythology

References 

Jeju mythology
Tamna